D-Day the Sixth of June is a DeLuxe Color 1956 CinemaScope romance war film made by 20th Century Fox. It was directed by Henry Koster and produced by Charles Brackett from a screenplay by Ivan Moffat and Harry Brown, based on the 1955 novel, The Sixth of June by Lionel Shapiro.

The film stars Robert Taylor, Richard Todd (who participated in the Normandy landings in real life), Dana Wynter, and Edmond O'Brien.

Plot
A few hours before D-Day, Special Force Six, a joint American-British-Canadian commando unit, embarks to destroy an especially well-defended German coastal gun emplacement on the Normandy coast. As the landing ship steams towards it, its commander, an Englishman, and one of his subordinates, an American, reflect on their love for the same woman.

Captain Brad Parker, an American paratrooper invalided out because of a broken leg suffered during a parachute jump, is posted to the headquarters of the European Theatre of Operations in London. At the Red Cross club, he meets and, despite being married, falls in love with Valerie Russell, an Auxiliary Territorial Service subaltern. Valerie is the daughter of a crusty brigadier who's been on sick leave since being wounded at Dunkirk. Valerie is also already in love with Captain John Wynter of the British Commandos, a friend of her father.

Both officers are posted overseas, but later return. Parker has volunteered to join what becomes Special Force Six, to be led by his former commander, Lt. Colonel (now full Colonel) Timmer.

With only a few hours before the operation is due to embark, Timmer goes to pieces (partly as a result of his earlier bad experiences in the failed Dieppe Raid) and is arrested whilst drunk and breaking security (this incident is clearly based on a similar breach of security by Major General Henry J. F. Miller). Wynter, now a colonel, who has recovered from being badly wounded, is brought in to command the operation. The operation is a success, despite several killed and wounded. Parker is badly wounded and evacuated. Wynter is wounded as well, and while he is awaiting evacuation, is killed when he steps on a mine.

In the hospital, and due to be repatriated, Parker sees Valerie for the last time. She does not tell him that Wynter has been killed, and, after a final embrace with Parker, Valeries leaves the hospital with her head hung in despondent loneliness.

Cast
 Robert Taylor as Captain Brad Parker
 Richard Todd as Lieutenant Colonel John Wynter
 Dana Wynter as Valerie Russell
 Edmond O'Brien as Lieutenant Colonel Alexander Timmer
 John Williams as Brigadier  Russell
 Robert Gist as Major Dan Stenick
 Richard Stapley as David Archer
 Ross Elliott as Major Mills 
 Alex Finlayson as Colonel Doug Harkens

Production
Lionel Shapiro (1908–1958) was a Canadian war correspondent for The Montreal Gazette who landed at the Allied invasion of Sicily, Salerno and Juno Beach on D-Day with the Canadian forces. His 1955 romantic novel The Sixth of June was awarded the Governor General's Award for English-language fiction. As opposed to a historical account such as The Longest Day, The Sixth of June is a love triangle of adulterous relationships set in war such as The Man in the Gray Flannel Suit that was also filmed by 20th Century Fox in 1956. Robert Taylor echoes his appearance in Waterloo Bridge by wearing a trenchcoat and romancing English lady Dana Wynter. Wynter called it her favorite of all her films, being an unresolved love story.

Though originally planned to be filmed in Britain with Jean Simmons as the female lead, The Sixth of June (the working title of the film) was made on the Fox backlot with naval scenes filmed at the Long Beach Naval Shipyard, featuring the hospital ship USS Haven (AH-12), whilst the beach landing was made at Point Dume California. Before the days of computer-generated imagery director Henry Koster had to make his landing look convincing on his limited budget with two LCVPs and eighty soldiers. In the invasion scene soldiers running out of the two landing craft appear in front of a back projection scene of another take of the same scene giving the appearance of twice as many landing craft and soldiers as there actually were.

Unlike many American war films D-Day the Sixth of June presents the viewpoints of British characters and features Canadian troops in action. The film's microcosm version of the Normandy landings is a Pointe du Hoc type assault featuring an imaginary "Special Force Six" made up of British, American and Canadian troops in equal quantities. When Taylor's character is wounded it is Todd and the British and Canadians who destroy the big gun that is the force's objective.

Edmond O'Brien's character is relieved of command in a similarity to US Army Ranger Major Cleveland A Lytle. Lytle who was to command three companies of the 2nd Ranger Battalion in the assault at Pointe du Hoc heard that Free French sources reported the guns thought to be there had been removed. Lytle became quite vocal that the assault would be unnecessary and suicidal and was relieved of his command at the last minute by Provisional Ranger Force commander Colonel James Rudder. Rudder felt that Lytle could not convincingly lead a force with a mission that he did not believe in. Lytle was later transferred to the 90th Infantry Division where he was awarded the Distinguished Service Cross.

Technical adviser Colonel Dan Gilmer had been General Eisenhower's Secretary in SHAEF during the D-Day preparation and landings.

Footnotes

External links
 
 
 
 

1956 films
1956 war films
American war films
1950s English-language films
Films based on Canadian novels
Films based on military novels
Films directed by Henry Koster
Films produced by Charles Brackett
Films scored by Lyn Murray
Films set in London
Films set in 1944
Operation Overlord films
Films with screenplays by Harry Brown (writer)
20th Century Fox films
War romance films
World War II films based on actual events
Films about the United States Army
Films about the British Army
Canadian Armed Forces in films
American World War II films
CinemaScope films
1950s American films